John Brown Watt (16 May 1826 – 28 September 1897) was a Scottish-born Australian businessman, banker, and politician. Watt was a member of the New South Wales Legislative Council in Sydney and a board member of the Imperial Federation League in London. Outside of state politics, he was a director of the Union Bank of Australia (now the Australia and New Zealand Banking Group Limited) and the Colonial Sugar Refining Company. He was also a director of the Sydney Infirmary and Dispensary and the Royal Prince Alfred Hospital, as well as the founder of the Hospital for Sick Children, Glebe.

Early life
Watt was born in Edinburgh, Mid-Lothian, Scotland, the eldest son of Royal Navy officer Alexander Hamilton Watt and his wife Margaret (née Gilchrist). His father was a relative of James Watt, inventor of the steam-engine and namesake of the watt energy metric. Watt graduated from the University of Edinburgh in 1840 and emigrated to Sydney via the Benares in 1842.

Early career
Watt was appointed a member of the New South Wales Legislative Council in September 1861, but resigned on leaving for England in March 1866. He was reappointed in October 1874. In 1877 he presented the sum of £1000 to the University of Sydney to found an exhibition for students from primary schools. He presided over the Royal Commission on Military Defences of 1881.

Later career
He was the Commissioner for New South Wales at the International Exhibitions of Philadelphia (1876), Paris (1878), Sydney (1879), Amsterdam (1883) and at Calcutta (1883–84). In 1884, he was invited to the United Kingdom to join the Executive Committee of the Imperial Federation League. In 1890, he forfeited his Legislative Council seat due to absence in England.

Further details

Watt died in Bournemouth, Dorset on 28 September 1897. He was survived by three of his five sons and five daughters, the youngest son was Oswald Watt,  a celebrated aviator. Another son, Ernest Watt, became the father-in-law of Sir Laurence Whistler Street when he married Ernest's daughter Susan Gai Watt, herself the first female chair of the Eastern Sydney Health Service (now amalgamated with Illawarra).

References

1826 births
1897 deaths
Members of the New South Wales Legislative Council
19th-century Australian politicians
Alumni of the University of Edinburgh
Scottish emigrants to Australia